Feriz (also Romanized as Ferīz, Farīz, and Ferīs; also known as Firīz and Fariz Khoosaf) is a village in Barakuh Rural District, Jolgeh-e Mazhan District, Khusf County, South Khorasan Province, Iran. At the 2006 census, its population was 216, in 81 families.

References 

Populated places in Khusf County